The 2010–11 HRV Cup (named after the competition's sponsor HRV) was the sixth season of the Men's Super Smash Twenty20 cricket tournament in New Zealand.  The season was held between 2 December 2010 and 2 January 2011.

Rules and regulations

If a match ended with the scores tied, the tie is broken with a one-over-per-side Super Over.

Standings

(C) = Eventual Champion; (R) = Runner-up.
Winner qualified for the qualifying stage of the 2011 Champions League Twenty20.

Teams

League progression

Results

Fixtures
All times shown are in New Zealand Daylight Time (UTC+13).

Group stage

Final

See also

Super Smash (cricket)
HRV
HRV Cup